Graniczna may refer to the following places in Poland:
Graniczna, Lower Silesian Voivodeship (south-west Poland)
Graniczna, Lublin Voivodeship (east Poland)
Graniczna, Pomeranian Voivodeship (north Poland)
Graniczna, West Pomeranian Voivodeship (north-west Poland)